"Wake Up" is the second single from Australian punk band the Living End's fourth album, State of Emergency (2006). It was released on 20 February 2006, peaking at number five on the Australian ARIA Singles Chart and number 12 in New Zealand, becoming the band's highest-charting single in the latter nation.

"Wake Up" was ranked on the Triple J Hottest 100 for 2006 at number 53, becoming the band's last consecutive appearance on the ranking since 1997. The music video, directed by Sean Gilligan and Sarah-Jane Woulahan, was nominated for Best Video at the ARIA Music Awards of 2006.

Track listing
Australian CD single
 "Wake Up" (album version) (Chris Cheney) – 4:31
 "Girls Talk" (Elvis Costello) – 3:08
 "Don't Turn Away" (C. Cheney) – 4:04

Charts

References

2006 singles
2006 songs
EMI Records singles
The Living End songs
Song recordings produced by Nick Launay
Songs written by Chris Cheney